Castlereagh Lower (named after the former barony of Castlereagh) is a historic barony in County Down, Northern Ireland. It was created by 1841 with the division of Castlereagh into two. The barony roughly matches the former Gaelic territory of Uí Blathmaic, anglicized Blathewic. It is bordered by three other baronies: Ards Lower to the east; Dufferin to the south; and Castlereagh Upper to the west and south-west. Castlereagh Lower is also bounded by Belfast Lough to the north and Strangford Lough to the south-east.

List of settlements
Below is a list of settlements in Castlereagh Lower:

Towns
Bangor (also partly in barony of Ards Lower)
Comber
Holywood
Newtownards (also partly in barony of Ards Lower)

Villages
Ardmillan
Crawfordsburn

Population centres
Dundonald

List of civil parishes
Below is a list of civil parishes in Castlereagh Lower:
Bangor (also partly in barony of Ards Lower)
Comber (also partly in barony of Castlereagh Upper)
Dundonald
Holywood
Killinchy (also partly in baronies of Castlereagh Upper and Dufferin)
Kilmood
Knockbreda (also partly in barony of Castlereagh Upper)
Newtownards (also partly in barony of Ards Lower)
Tullynakill

References

 
Clandeboye